Mazzarrone (Sicilian: Mazzarruni) is a comune (municipality) in the Metropolitan City of Catania in the Italian region Sicily, located about  southeast of Palermo and about  southwest of Catania.

Mazzarrone borders the following municipalities: Acate, Caltagirone, Chiaramonte Gulfi, Licodia Eubea. It is best known for production of the table grapes named after it, the Mazzarrone grape.

References

External links
 Official website

Cities and towns in Sicily